Montelíbano Airport  is an airport serving the city of Montelíbano in the Córdoba Department of Colombia.

See also

Transport in Colombia
List of airports in Colombia

References

External links
OpenStreetMap - Montelíbano
OurAirports - Montelíbano
SkyVector - Montelíbano
Montelíbano Airport

Airports in Colombia